Khazar Lankaran FK is an Azerbaijani football club based in Lankaran that last played in the Azerbaijan Premier League during the 2015–16 season. 
Since the summer of 2016 the club has concentrated on youth football. It played in the Azerbaijan Premier League for twelve-seasons, winning the title once, and the Azerbaijan Cup three times. Khazar were also a member of the European Club Association, an organization that replaced the previous G-14 which consists of major football clubs in Europe.

History

Early years (2004–2012)
The club was founded in 2004 by Azerbaijani entrepreneur Mubariz Mansimov and dubbed by the local media as "Caucasian Chelsea" because of its strong financial position. Under Agaselim Mirjavadov club won Premier League title during the 2006–07 season and the Azerbaijan Cup twice. Khazar also won the CIS Cup in 2008, defeating Pakhtakor Tashkent in the final.

After Fabian Veldwijk's appointment, a string of Romanian players and footballers were signed from Liga I, but the club did not find success in European cup competition. On 4 December 2013, Khazar announced that Veldwijk had been sacked by the club due to a run of poor performances.

Recent years (2014––2016)
In July 2014, the club under Yunis Huseynov earned their first win in European competition by beating Nõmme Kalju. In March 2015, former Liverpool striker John Toshack was appointed as new manager after signing two-year deal with the club. In 2015–16 season, Khazar finished in 12th place, the club's lowest finishing position to date. Khazar Lankaran once again featured in European competitions during the 2015–16 season, featuring in the UEFA Europa League, where they were knocked out 3–0 on aggregate after suffering their heaviest European defeat ever, losing 8–0 to Maccabi Haifa.

Following the Professional Football League of Azerbaijan's decision to deny Khazar a licence for the 2016–17 season, the club announced their withdrawal from professional football.

League and cup history

European history
As of 17 July 2013.

Crest and colours 
The club's crest includes stockless anchor with a football ball. The badge shaped like traditional compass with white-green background elements.

Shirt sponsors and kit manufacturers 
Khazar's traditional kit is composed of white shirts, green shorts and white socks.  The club's kits are manufactured by Puma and sponsored by Palmali, a multinational shipping company in Istanbul.

Stadium 

Khazar Lankaran's home ground is Lankaran City Stadium. It has a capacity of 15,000 and is the third largest stadium in Azerbaijan. The stadium also known as Fırtınalar meydanı (Arena of Storms), named after club's local supporters Fırtına fan group.

On 17 July 2009, UEFA approved stadium for the usage during international football matches. The stadium hosted its first senior international match on 5 September 2009, between Azerbaijan and Finland.

Supporters
Khazar is one of the best supported clubs in Azerbaijan, having the highest attendance after FC Kapaz in the Caucasus region. Supporters of Khazar Lankaran are drawn from all over the Southern Region and beyond, with supporters' clubs all across the world. The club's supporters are also known as the Fırtına(Storm) the first established independent fan club in Azernaijan. Fan club's first president Ravan Bashirov also been appointed as vice- president of Khazar Lankaran FC. .

Rivalry with Neftchi Baku

There is often a fierce rivalry between the two strongest teams in the Azerbaijan Premier League, and this is particularly the case in Azerbaijan, where the game between Khazar Lankaran and Neftchi Baku is known as Böyük Oyun (The Great Game).

Honours

National
Azerbaijan Premier League
 Winners (1): 2006–07
Azerbaijan Cup
 Winners (3): 2006–07, 2007–08, 2010–11
 Azerbaijan Supercup
 Winners (1): 2013

Regional
CIS Cup
 Winners (1): 2008

Individual records
Lists of the players with the most caps and top goalscorers for the club, as of 30 August 2014 (players in bold signifies current Khazar player). Zaur Ramazanov is the club's all-time top scorer with 33 goals in 69 games.

Notable managers

The following managers have all won at least one trophy when in charge of FK Khazar Lankaran:

In popular culture
A number of television programmes have included references to Khazar Lankaran over the past few decades. In the sitcom Aramizda Galsin, the character Jasarat is a Khazar supporter. Khazar have also featured on several occasions in meykhana.

References

External links
Official website 

 
Khazar Lenkoran
Lankaran
Association football clubs established in 2004
2004 establishments in Azerbaijan
Defunct football clubs in Azerbaijan
Association football clubs disestablished in 2016
2016 disestablishments in Azerbaijan